Elijah of Buxton is a children's novel written by Christopher Paul Curtis and published in 2007. The book won critical praise and was a Newbery Honor book and the winner of the Coretta Scott King Award.  It also was a children's book bestseller.

Summary
Elijah of Buxton is about an eleven
boy, Elijah Freeman, who lives in Buxton, Canada. It was started as the Elgin Settlement, a refugee camp for African-American slaves who escaped via the Underground Railroad to gain freedom in Canada. Elijah is the first free-born child in the settlement, and has never lived under slavery. He has only heard of it. He goes into the United States to help stop a man from his settlement from stealing money from his friend, and learns there that it is a privilege to be free.

Reception
Elijah of Buxton has been well received. School Library Journal called it "an example of everything Curtis does well. His historical research is superior. His characters heartwarming. His prose funny and heart-wrenching in turns." and "A great book and well deserving of any buzz it happens to achieve." Kirkus Reviews gave a starred review, declaring "This is Curtis’s best novel yet, and no doubt many readers, young and old, will finish and say, "This is one of the best books I have ever read.""

Publishers Weekly wrote, "The arresting historical setting and physical comedy signal classic Curtis (Bud, Not Buddy), but while Elijah's boyish voice represents the Newbery Medalist at his finest, the story unspools at so leisurely a pace that kids might easily lose interest." and "The powerful ending is violent and unsettling, yet also manages to be uplifting." Common Sense Media awarded it five stars, calling it a "humorous, powerful, masterful escape-slave tale" and asserted "This wonderful, moving novel is sure to become a staple of discussion groups in schools and libraries across the country."

Awards
It has won a number of awards including a 2008 Newbery Honor, the 2008 Coretta Scott King Award, the 2008 Scott O'Dell Award for Historical Fiction, and the 2008 Canadian Library Association Book of the Year for Children Award

References

2007 American novels
Newbery Honor-winning works
Novels by Christopher Paul Curtis
Canadian children's novels
Novels set in Ontario
Children's historical novels
American historical novels
Works about the Underground Railroad
African-American novels
2007 children's books
Coretta Scott King Award-winning works